In the mathematical discipline of descriptive set theory, a coanalytic set is a set (typically a set of real numbers or more generally a subset of a Polish space) that is the complement of an analytic set (Kechris 1994:87). Coanalytic sets are also referred to as  sets (see projective hierarchy).

References
 

Descriptive set theory